The Gujarat High Court is the High Court of the state of Gujarat. It was established on 1 May 1960 under the Bombay Re-organisation Act, 1960 after the state of Gujarat split from Bombay State.

The seat of the court is Ahmedabad. The present strength of the Gujarat High court is 29 against sanctioned strength of 52.

Establishment
This High Court was established on 1 May 1960 as a result of bifurcation of the former State of Bombay into two States of Maharashtra and Gujarat.  The High Court started functioning near Akashwani, Navrangpura, Ahmedabad. The High Court had later shifted to the new building at Sarkhej - Gandhinagar Highway, Sola, Ahmedabad, Gujarat, from 16 January 1999.

Jurisdiction
The Gujarat High Court has jurisdiction over the entire state of Gujarat. It has jurisdiction on all district, administrative and other courts in Gujarat. This high court is a Court of record and empowered to punish anyone for contempt of court.

Powers
Unlike Union Judiciary, the state judiciary possesses wide powers which include powers such as Appellate, Second Appellate in some cases, Revisionary, Review etc. It also has power to issue various writs to courts and authorities under its jurisdiction. Intra-Court appeals, when permissible under Clause - 15 of Letters Patent, also lie within the same court from decision of a Single Judge to a Division Bench which comprises two Judges. It has power of superintendence on all courts under it under Article 227 of the Constitution of India. The High Courts are also empowered to hear Public Interest Litigations.

The Chief Justice

The bench of high court is presided over by the Chief Justice on administrative side. They are appointed by President of India under warrant. However, the president is required to consult the Governor of Gujarat and the Chief Justice of India before making such appointment. The Governor of Gujarat administers the oath of office at the time of appointment. The present Acting Chief Justice of the court is Chief Justice Ashish Jitendra Desai. Various benches are constituted depending upon the requirements of that High Court. These benches usually consist of division benches (two judges) and benches presided over by single judges. A roster is maintained by the High Court to assign the matters between various benches. Chief Justices in all the High Courts as also the Chief Justice of the Supreme Court are masters of the roster.

Judges
All judges of the high court are appointed by the President of India after recommendation by the Supreme Court Collegium. They hold constitutional post and there are ample safeguards provided in the constitution to ensure the independence of the judiciary. Any judge can resign by writing to the President of India. Terms of appointment of judges cannot be altered to their disadvantage after their appointment.

Qualifications
The following are qualifications to be judge of Gujarat High Court or any other High Court in India.
 The individual must be citizen of India
 The individual must have held a judicial office in India for at least ten years; or
 Been advocate in any high court or two or more courts in succession for at least 10 years.

The Bench
The present strength of Gujarat High court is 29 against sanctioned strength of 52 posts which includes 39 permanent posts and 13 additional posts.

Following is the list of the Hon'ble Judges who currently preside over various benches of this High Court in the order of seniority.

 Hon'ble the Acting Chief Justice  Mr. Justice A J Desai
 Hon'ble Mr. Justice N V Anjaria
 Hon'ble Mr. Justice S H Vora
 Hon'ble Mr. Justice Vipul M Pancholi
 Hon'ble Mr. Justice Ashutosh J Shastri
 Hon'ble Mr. Justice Biren Vaishnav
 Hon'ble Mr. Justice A Y Kogje
 Hon'ble Mr. Justice A S Supehia
 Hon'ble Mr. Justice Umesh A Trivedi
 Hon'ble Mr. Justice Bhargav D Karia
 Hon'ble Ms. Justice Sangeeta K Vishen
 Hon'ble Mr. Justice Ilesh J Vora
 Hon'ble Ms. Justice Gita Gopi
 Hon'ble Mr. Justice Rajendra M Sareen
 Hon'ble Ms. Justice Vabhavi D Nanavati
 Hon'ble Mr. Justice Nirzar S Desai
 Hon'ble Mr. Justice Nikhil S Kariel
 Hon'ble Ms. Justice Mauna M Bhatt
 Hon'ble Mr. Justice Samir J Dave
 Hon'ble Mr. Justice Hemant M Prachchhak
 Hon'ble Mr. Justice Sandeep N Bhatt
 Hon'ble Mr. Justice Aniruddha P Mayee
 Hon'ble Mr. Justice Niral Mehta
 Hon'ble Ms. Justice Nisha M Thakore
 Hon'ble Ms. Justice S V Pinto
 Hon'ble Mr. Justice H D Suthar
 Hon'ble Mr. Justice J C Doshi
 Hon'ble Mr. Justice M R Mengdey
 Hon'ble Mr. Justice D A Joshi

Former Chief Justices

See also
High Courts of India

Notes

References
 Jurisdiction and Seats of Indian High Courts
  Judge strength in High Courts increased
 High Courts job lest update

External links
 The Gujarat High Court official website
The Gujarat High Court official YouTube Channel
The High Court of Gujarat official Telegram Channel

High Court
1960 establishments in Gujarat
Courts and tribunals established in 1960